John Manning may refer to:

Politics
 John B. Manning (1833–1908), mayor of Buffalo, New York
 John Lawrence Manning (1816–1889), Governor of South Carolina, 1852–1854
 John Manning Jr. (1830–1899), U.S. Representative from North Carolina

Sports
 John Manning (footballer) (1940–2021), English football player
 John Manning (rugby union) (fl. 1880–1904), Australian rugby player
 John Manning (rugby league) (born 1978), Australian actor and former rugby league footballer

Other
 John Manning (journalist) (died 1868), New Zealand newspaper editor
 John Charles Manning (born 1962), South African botanist
 John Edmondson Manning (1848–1910), English Unitarian minister
 John F. Manning (born 1961), Harvard Law School dean
 John J. Manning (1842–1911), Irish American frontiersman
 John Ruel Manning (1897–1939), American chemist and technologist
 John Manning, co-founder of the Atlantic Brass Quintet

See also
Jack Manning (disambiguation)